João Pedro da Cruz (born 31 October 1915, Évora, Portugal - 7 July 1981) known as João Cruz was a Portuguese football player who played forward for Vitória Setúbal and Sporting CP.

International career 

João Cruz played 10 games and scored 3 goals for the Portugal national team. Cruz made his debut 9 January 1938 in Lisboa against Hungary, and scored 2 goals in a 4–0 victory. He played his last game 1 January 1942 against Switzerland in a 3–0 victory in Lisboa.

References 
 https://web.archive.org/web/20110815205950/http://eu-football-info.1gb.ua/_player.php?id=4008

1915 births
People from Évora
Portuguese footballers
Sporting CP footballers
Vitória F.C. players
Portugal international footballers
1981 deaths
Association football forwards
Sportspeople from Évora District